Fredette Lake is a remote northern lake of Saskatchewan, Canada, located north of Eldorado, Saskatchewan.  The lake has several islands the largest being Dewar Island.

Since all of the northern mining operations are downstream of the lake, it is commonly used as a reference site to determine normal background levels when studying other surrounding areas near Uranium City.

See also
List of lakes of Saskatchewan

References

Lakes of Saskatchewan